Inna Korobkina is a Russian Canadian actress. She has acted in Russian and English.

Career 
Korobkina is known for her appearance in the 2004 remake film Dawn of the Dead. She also appeared in several T.V. series like Beautiful People, Angela's Eyes or The Newsroom and had some minor roles in movies like How to Deal and The Ladies Man.

Filmography 
 The Ladies Man (2000) .... Hef's Girl
 How to Deal (2003) .... Flight Attendant (uncredited)
 1-800-Missing (1 episode, "Ties That Bind", 2003) .... Nadia Fedorova
 Dawn of the Dead (2004) .... Luda
 Surviving the Dawn (2004) (V) .... Herself (also archive footage)
 Attack of the Living Dead (2004) (V) .... Herself (also archive footage)
 The Newsroom (1 episode, "The British Accent", 2004) .... Saleswoman
 Riding the Bus with My Sister (2005) (TV) .... Model/Bride
 Lovebites (unknown episodes, 2006) .... Foreign Chick
 Beautiful People (1 episode, "Das Boots", 2006) .... Chloe
 Angela's Eyes (2 episodes, "Lyin' Eyes" and "The Camera's Eye", 2006) .... Chameleon
 Across the River to Motor City (1 episode, "Treat Her Right", 2007) .... Isobel
 The Border (1 episode, "Compromising Positions", 2008) .... Svetlana Karpova
 Driven to Kill (2009) .... Catherine Goldstein
 Let the Game Begin (2010) .... Bridesmaid
 Transformers: Dark of the Moon (2011) .... Russian girl
 Clean Me (2013) .... Julia Markham

External links 
 

Year of birth missing (living people)
Russian emigrants to Canada
Russian film actresses
Canadian film actresses
Canadian people of Russian descent
Living people
People from Magadan
Toronto Metropolitan University alumni